Fabius Dorsuo was a Roman name used by men of the gens Fabia, including:

 Gaius Fabius Dorsuo (praenomen in one source as Caeso), known for exhibiting exceptional piety during the Gallic siege of Rome in 390 BC, possibly as pontifex; the account, which varies, should perhaps be regarded as legend.
 Marcus Fabius Dorsuo, consul in 345 BC, possibly also interrex in 340 and in 334 one of the commissioners for establishing a colony (triumviri coloniae deducendae) at Cales.

References

.Dorsuo